Dharam Kanta ( Balance of Piety) is a 1982 Hindi-language action film, produced and directed by Sultan Ahmed under the Sultan Productions banner. It stars Raaj Kumar, Waheeda Rehman, Jeetendra, Rajesh Khanna, Reena Roy, Sulakshana Pandit, Amjad Khan in the pivotal roles and music composed by Naushad. The movie was a hit on its release and completed silver jubilee

Plot
Thakur Bhavani Singh heads a gang of dacoits, who have spread terror and fear in the region. Bhavani has a family, consisting of his wife, Radha, and two sons, Ram and Laxman, and a daughter named Ganga. One day, Bhavani kidnaps the son of wealthy Harnam Singh and will release him for a hefty ransom. Harnam agrees to all the conditions, and hands over the money to Bhavani. Unfortunately, Harnam's child is killed, and his wife, devastated, curses Bhavani and his family. Subsequently, Bhavani is separated from his family due to heavy rains and floods, and decides to turn himself into the police, and is sent to prison. His wife has been unable to locate any of their children. Ram and Laxman are taken in by two bandits and turn to a life of crime, and ironically Ganga is adopted by Harnam Singh. Years later, Bhavani is released from prison, and comes to meet his wife, and is devastated to know that he may never get to see his children again. Bhavani starts living an honest life, not knowing that his estranged sons are leading a life of crime and that his daughter is now living with the family, whose son he killed.

Cast

 Raaj Kumar as Thakur Bhavani Singh
 Waheeda Rehman as Thakurain Radha Singh
 Jeetendra as Laxman Singh / Shiva
 Rajesh Khanna as Ram Singh / Shankar
 Reena Roy as Bijli
 Sulakshana Pandit as Chanda
 Heena Kausar as Ganga Singh
 Amjad Khan as Chandan Singh / Jwala Singh (Double Role)
 Satyendra Kapoor as Thakur Harnam Singh
 Purnima as Mrs. Harnam Singh
Gajanan Jagirdar as Mukhiya 
 Om Prakash as Fakira
 Nazir Hussain as Priest
 Mukri as Shiva's Foster Father  
 Nisar Ahmad Ansari as Jailor

Soundtrack
All songs composed by Naushad and all lyrics by Majrooh

References

External links

1980s Hindi-language films
1982 films
Films scored by Naushad